Pakistan Federation Baseball (PFB) is the governing body for baseball in Pakistan. The Federation was founded in 1992 by Syed Khawar Shah, to promote the games of baseball in the country. The PFB has hosted the Asian Baseball Cup on several occasions.

In 2015, Pakistan national baseball team took part in the Asian Baseball Championship in Taiwan as the West Asian Champion. In 2016, it debuted in the World Baseball Classic qualification in New York, following its 5th-place finish at the 2015 Asian Baseball Championship.

In 2016, Pakistan women's national baseball team made their debut at the World Championship in South Korea. As of 2017, it is ranked sixth in Asia out of 15.

In 2017, PFB launched a development programme in FATA. 20 young baseball players were selected for training at Pakistan Youth Baseball Academy.

WAPDA's baseball team is the current reigning national champion after their 4-2 win over Pakistan Army's team in the final to win the title of 22nd National Baseball Championship.

PFB is affiliated with:
 International Baseball Federation
 Baseball Federation of Asia
 Pakistan Sports Board
 Pakistan Olympic Association

See also
Pakistan national baseball team
Pakistan women's national baseball team

External links
 Official Website

References

Baseball governing bodies in Asia
Sports governing bodies in Pakistan
Baseball in Pakistan
Sports organizations established in 1992
1992 establishments in Pakistan